The 2010 China Baseball League season saw the Guangdong Leopards defeat the Beijing Tigers in 2 games to win the Championship Series.

Awards

References

External links
Official website Chinese

China Baseball League